Azal branco is a white Portuguese wine grape planted primarily in the Minho region but with greater expansion to Amarante, Basto, Baião and Vale do Sousa sub-regions. It noted for the high acidity of its wines, and is used for white Vinho Verde. Varietal Azal Branco wines can be somewhat reminiscent of Riesling.

The Azal variety provides an intense green color when maturated and an aroma of citric fruits (such as lemon or green apple) and nuts. It produces young, fresh yet acidic wines.

Synonyms
Azal branco is also known under the synonyms Asal branco, Asal da Lixa, Azal bianco, Azal da Lixa, Carvalha, Carvalhal, Es Pinheira, Gadelhudo, and Pinheira.

See also
Azal tinto
List of Portuguese grape varieties

References

White wine grape varieties